Smash the Windows is the first full-length album from the DIY folk punk band Mischief Brew.  The album was released in 2005 by Fistolo Records (US), and in 2006 by Gunner Records (EU). It was recorded in Williamsburg, Brooklyn, NY at Vibromonk Studios by Tamir Muskat and Danny Shatzky, December 2004-January 2005.  The album has guest appearances from members of World Inferno, Guignol, Evil Robot Us', and Leftöver Crack.

Critical reception
Reviews for 'Smash the Windows' were mixed, but mostly favorable.  Punknews called it, "DIY folk punk at its finest," while HeartattaCk Zine praised the lyrics: "Poetic anthems to a downtrodden life and the hope for a brighter tomorrow that inspire you to throw a wrench in the gears and enjoy what little of the natural world is left."  Razorcake Magazine, however, described it as "Sub-Pogues pseudo Celtic style balladeering," claiming that it "[never] really rocks out; it just plods along like a campfire singalong."

Shortly after its release, The Village Voice rated Erik Petersen/Mischief Brew "Best Anarchist Political Folk-Punk Singer" in their Best of NYC 2005 Issue.  Alternative Press rated "A Liquor Never Brewed" one of the "Top Ten Essential Folk Punk Songs."

Track listing
"The Reinvention of the Printing Press" - 2:41
"Citizens Drive" - 4:28
"Lightning Knock the Power Out" - 3:43
"Nomads Revolt" - 4:04
"The Lowly Carpenter" - 3:04
"Ten Thousand Fleas" - 3:52
"Swing Against the Nazis" - 3:04
"From the Rooftops" - 4:37
"The Gypsy, the Punk, and the Fool (A Tale)" - 6:21
"Roll Me Through the Gates of Hell" - 3:36
"Ain't It the Life?" - 3:20
"A Liquor Never Brewed (with Guignol)" - 3:21
"Departure Arrival" - 2:39

Personnel
Erik Petersen - Vocals, guitar, mandolin, percussion
Sean Yantz - Bass
Chris "Doc" Kulp - Drums, bodhran, marimba, junk percussion
Julian Tomas Buchanan - Saxophone
Franz Nicolay - Accordion
Peter Hess - Clarinet
Denise Vertucci - Vocals
Scott Sturgeon - Vocals
Jim Kydonieus - Upright bass
Tamir Muskat - Engineer
Danny Shatzky - Engineer
Steve Roche - Engineer

References

Mischief Brew albums
2005 albums